Frederick John Vivian "Ian" Smith, 2nd Baron Colwyn (26 November 1914 – 29 May 1966) was the son of the Honourable Frederick Henry Smith, and grandson of Frederick Smith, 1st Baron Colwyn. He was educated at Malvern College. He was a stockbroker and during  World War II a captain of the 2nd Battalion, Gordon Highlanders. He sustained an injury during his military service.

On 26 January 1946 he inherited the barony from his grandfather. He took his seat in the House of Lords on 19 April 1955.

He married three times: firstly, in 1940, to Miriam Gwendoline Ferguson. They divorced in 1951. Secondly, in 1952, to Hermoine Sophia O'Bryen Hoare. They divorced in 1954. Thirdly, in 1955 to Beryl Reddington. His last wife Beryl remarried in 1969 to the botanist, George Taylor. 

With his first wife he had a son Ian Anthony who succeeded to the title on the death of his father in 1966.

References

1914 births
1966 deaths
People educated at Malvern College
Barons in the Peerage of the United Kingdom